Simon Bonetti (born 10 January 1977) is an Australian former professional rugby league footballer who played in the 1990s and 2000s. He played for the Sydney Roosters. His position was hooker, renowned for his tackling abilities and the fact he rarely scored a try.

Playing career
Hailing from Griffith, New South Wales where his family farmed rice, Bonetti played six seasons with the Roosters and appeared in two premiership deciders for them: the loss Brisbane in the 2000 NRL Grand Final and the win over the New Zealand Warriors in the 2002 NRL Grand Final. He retired from Rugby League after winning the 2002 Grand Final.

He was also eligible to represent the Italy national rugby league team.

References

1977 births
Living people
Australian people of Italian descent
Australian rugby league players
Rugby league hookers
Rugby league players from Griffith, New South Wales
Sydney Roosters players